Mohammad Rafiq or Rafique may refer to:
Muhammad Rafiq (brigadier) (fl. 1950s), Pakistani Commandant
Mohammad Rafiq (judge) (born 1960), Indian Judge and the Chief Justice of Himachal Pradesh High Court
Muhammad Rafiq Tarar (born 1929), Pakistani judge and then president
Mohammed Rafique Mughal (born 1936), Pakistani archaeologist
Mohammad Rafiq (poet) (born 1943), winner of the Bangla Academy Awards in 1987
Mohammed Rafik Khatri (born 1970), Indian Master craftsman
Mohammad Rafique (cricketer) (born 1970), Bangladeshi cricketer
Mohammed Rafique (footballer) (born 1992), Indian footballer
Mohammad Rafiq (born 1954), retired Pakistani Air Force officer known for overpowering the attacker of Bærum mosque shooting
Mohd Rafiq Naizamohideen (born 1986), Malaysian politician